Palar is a river in the Indian states of Karnataka and Tamil Nadu.  It originates near Guthiyalathur in Bhavani Taluk of Erode district in Tamil Nadu and forms border between Karnataka and Tamil Nadu. Later, it flows into the Kaveri River near Palar in Karnataka and Tamil Nadu.

1993 Bomb blasts
This River is infamous for the 1993 blasts that took place on the banks of the River from sandalwood smuggler Veerappan.

See also 
Hogenakkal Falls
List of rivers of Tamil Nadu
Kaveri River water dispute
Kaveri River

References 

Rivers of Karnataka
Inter-state disputes in India
Rivers of Tamil Nadu
Kaveri River
Rivers of India